Capt. Ebe Chandler House is a historic home located at Frankford, Sussex County, Delaware.  It was built in 1880, and is a -story, six bay, double-pile frame dwelling in the Victorian Gothic style. It has a gable roof with  two massive cross gables and lancet windows. Elaborate Carpenter Gothic and eclectic detailing were added in 1918. The front porch features corner gazebos, located at each of the front corners of the porch. It has been converted to two duplex apartments. Capt. Ebe Chandler purchased the house in 1918, and was a local politician, civic leader, and a spiritualist medium.

It was added to the National Register of Historic Places in 1979.

References

Houses on the National Register of Historic Places in Delaware
Houses completed in 1880
Gothic Revival architecture in Delaware
Houses in Sussex County, Delaware
1880 establishments in Delaware
National Register of Historic Places in Sussex County, Delaware